The 1999 Forest Heath District Council election took place on 6 May 1999 to elect members of Forest Heath District Council in England. This was on the same day as other local elections.

Summary

|}

References

Forest Heath District Council elections
1999 English local elections
May 1999 events in the United Kingdom
1990s in Suffolk